Minićevo (till 1945. Andrejevac and before that Yeni Han (The New Country Inn, in Ottoman Turkish), translated to Novi Han after it became a part of the Principality of Serbia and eventually Kraljevo Selo (The King's Village, in Serbian) in 1894-1938, in which capacity it had the status of a small municipal centre) is located in the municipality of Knjaževac, Serbia. 

According to the 2002 census, the village has a population of 828 people.

References 

Populated places in Zaječar District